Gazipur Cantonment College (also referred to as GCC), is a college B.O.F, Gazipur Cantonment, Gazipur, Bangladesh. The college offers education for students ranging from Eleventh grade to Graduation (approximately ages 16 to 19) both male and female.

Teachers forum
Gazipur Cantonment College is controlled by the Ordnance Factory of Bangladesh. All the teachers are appointed by the committee of the college.

References

External links
 Official website

Colleges in Gazipur District
Educational institutions established in 1992
Educational Institutions affiliated with Bangladesh Army
1992 establishments in Bangladesh